Madhuvanahalli  is a village in the southern state of Karnataka, India. It is located in the Kollegal taluk of Chamarajanagar district in Karnataka.

Demographics
As of 2001 India census, Madhuvanahalli had a population of 7866 with 4023 males and 3843 females.

See also
 Chamarajanagar
 Districts of Karnataka

References

External links
 http://Chamarajanagar.nic.in/

Villages in Chamarajanagar district